The singularity spectrum is a function used in Multifractal analysis to describe the fractal dimension of a subset of points of a function belonging to a group of points that have the same Hölder exponent.  Intuitively, the singularity spectrum gives a value for how "fractal" a set of points are in a function.

More formally, the singularity spectrum  of a function, is defined as:

See also
 Multifractal analysis
 Holder exponent
 Hausdorff dimension
 Fractal
 Fractional Brownian motion

References
 .

Fractals